Electravia - Helices E-Props is a French aviation manufacturer based in Vaumeilh, specializing in the non-certified light aviation sector. At one time it produced electric propulsion systems and now designs and manufactures carbon fibre propellers for light aircraft.

History

The company was originally organized as an association called APAME to build and fly electric aircraft. It first flew its BL1E Electra on Sunday, 23 December 2007 at Aspres sur Buech airfield, Hautes Alpes, France. Test pilot Christian Vandamme flew the electric-powered, open-cockpit, strut-equipped airplane for 48 minutes, covering . The BL1E Electra is powered by an  disk-brushed electric engine driven by a  KOKAM Lithium polymer battery. The BL1E Electra was the first registered aircraft in the world powered by an electric motor running on batteries.

The company was founded on 19 September 2008 by Anne Lavrand, Jérémie Buiatti and Christian Vandamme. At the time of its founding it mainly produced electric motors for light aircraft.

Starting in 2008, Electravia began designing and manufacturing carbon fibre aircraft propellers, including fixed pitch, ground-adjustable pitch and variable pitch models. Propellers for paramotors, ultralights, light aircraft and UAV are made in the  workshop on Sisteron's airfield (LFNS). E-Props propellers claim to be the lightest on the market.

On 5 September 2010, pilot Hugues Duval established a world speed record for electric aircraft with his twin engined MC15E Cri-Cri E-Cristaline, equipped with Electravia engines, controllers, batteries and propellers.

In 2011 the E-FENIX became the first 100% electric two-seater paramotor.

In 2012 the E-SPIDER was shown at the Mondial of Paramotors in Basse-Ham. It was the first two-seater electric paramotor capable of being foot-launched.

By 2014 the company was producing a range of electric aircraft engines, including the Electravia GMPE 102, Electravia GMPE 104 and the Electravia GMPE 205.

Electravia also produced a number of electric-powered ultralight trike designs, including the Electravia Electro Trike and the Electravia Monotrace-E, which was based on the AEF Monotrace.

In 2014, the company decided to stop making electric motors to focus on the design of carbon fibre propellers.

On 9 July 2015, the electric MC15E CriCri E-Cristaline became the first electric aircraft to cross the English Channel.

By 2019, the propeller market for paramotors represented 40% of the company's sales. The company sold 4,500 models in over 80 countries.

Originally E-Props propeller usage was restricted to visual flight rules conditions by the manufacturer, but this restriction was rescinded in a new edition of the Instruction and Service Manual issued in 2020. This edition replaced the earlier limitation with a warning stating "E-PROPS propellers are not 'certified' propellers: they are not compliant with aeronautical standard as AESA or FAA. However, they are compliant with the ASTM F2506-13 (LSA). Their use is the sole responsibility of the owner / pilot of the aircraft. The user admits knowing and accepting the risks of using such propellers, and admits knowing that his engine could stop abruptly."

By 2021, the company had 40 aeronautical engineers and technicians and was producing 45,000 propeller blades per year and had started work to certify its propellers and production methods to European Union Aviation Safety Agency standards (DOA / CS-P / PART 21G).

As of 2022, E-Props propellers are fitted to 220 different light aircraft and microlight models and 150 brands of paramotors. The company works directly with 35 major aircraft and microlight manufacturers to design its products. It exports 87% of its propeller production to 80 different countries.

References

External links

Electric aircraft
French companies established in 2008
Aircraft manufacturers of France
Companies based in Provence-Alpes-Côte d'Azur